Bastos is a municipality in São Paulo, Brazil.

Bastos may also refer to:

 Bastos (surname)
 Bastos (Angolan footballer) (born 1991)
 Bastos (cigarette), a Spanish brand
 Bastos racing team, a 2001–02 Belgian WRC auto racing team
 Bastos, a neighborhood of Yaoundé, Cameroon

See also